Fuoss is a surname. Notable people with the surname include:

Donald E. Fuoss (1923–2014), American basketball and football coach
Paul Fuoss, American physicist
Raymond Fuoss (1905–1987), American chemist